Charcoal-burning suicide is suicide by burning charcoal in a closed room or area. Death occurs by carbon monoxide poisoning.

Mechanism of action

As the charcoal burns, the concentration of carbon monoxide (CO), produced by the incomplete combustion of carbon, gradually increases. CO concentrations of as little as one part per thousand can be fatal if inhaled over a period of two hours.

History
One of the earliest known suicides by inhalation of charcoal fumes may have been that of Seneca (65 AD) as well as Amédée Berthollet (1811), son of Claude Louis Berthollet. The suicide method also appears in nineteenth-century literature such as Eugène Sue's The Wandering Jew (1844).

Incidents 
Two students of Taipei First Girls' High School ended their lives by charcoal-burning in a hotel in Su'ao, Yilan in July 1994. They left a note that did not state the reason for killing themselves clearly, even though that it was suspected in some mass media that they were a lesbian couple.

A middle-aged woman in Hong Kong took her own life using this method inside her small, sealed bedroom in November 1998. She had a chemical engineering background. She was suffering from an economic depression at the time, and suicide in general was increasing. After the details of this suicide were highly publicised by local mass media, many others killed themselves in this way (an example of the Werther effect). Within two months, charcoal-burning had become the third major suicide killer in Hong Kong. Charcoal-burning suicide accounted for 1.7% of Hong Kong suicides in 1998 and 10.1% in 1999. By 2001, it had surpassed hanging as the second most-common method of suicide in Hong Kong (second only to jumping), accounting for about 25% of all suicide deaths. The method has since spread to mainland China, Taiwan and Japan.

Starting in 2003, authorities in Japan have seen a series of group suicides committed by strangers who met in suicide chat rooms online. Such a group will typically use sleeping pills and charcoal stoves in a van parked in a remote area.

On July 26, 2006, 16-year-old Brazilian musician Vinícius Gageiro Marques, known by his alias Yoñlu, locked himself in his bathroom with two barbecue grills, and posted on a forum asking for help killing himself. While some people in the thread pleaded him to stop, others gave him the advice he wanted. A Canadian online friend of Marques's learned of the suicide attempt and called the Brazilian authorities. Although the police and paramedics were able to enter the apartment and clear the smoke, Marques was pronounced dead after multiple attempts at resuscitation.

Brad Delp, the lead singer of the American rock band Boston, killed himself using this method on March 9, 2007.

Kim Jong-hyun, a member of the South Korean idol group Shinee, was found unconscious in a Gangnam residential hotel on December 18, 2017. He was later pronounced dead in the ICU, aged 27. The police ultimately ruled his death a suicide through the earlier text messages sent to his sister, after the discovery of charcoal briquette remnants in a frying pan at the scene.

Du Yuwei, an ex-member of GNZ48, ended her life on October 16, 2018 using this method.

References

Suicide methods
Charcoal